Modinagar is a town and a municipal board in Ghaziabad district in the Indian state of Uttar Pradesh. It's just 24 km from Ghaziabad city, 48 km from New Delhi. It is a part of National Capital Region.

The city was founded in 1933 by Rai Bahadur Gujar Mal Modi who established the Modi Group of Industries here along with his brother, Kedar Nath Modi. It is approximately 45 kilometres north-east of New Delhi. It is situated on Ghaziabad Meerut National Highway No. 58, approximately equally distant from Meerut and Ghaziabad. It is best known as the home of business conglomerate Modi Enterprises. In recent years, Modinagar has been developed as an educational hub as many new institutions are being established in and around the city due to its location in National Capital Region. Modinagar is also a part of Delhi–Meerut Regional Rapid Transit System. It is connected to recently constructed Delhi - Meerut Expressway (NE-3) via Bhojpur exit.

Boundaries

It lies in Lat. 280 50' north and Long. 770 35' east, 25 km north-east of Ghaziabad.

Modinagar lies on the Delhi-Mussoorie National Highway (NH-58). Parallel to this road runs the Delhi-Saharanpur section of the Northern Railway. A metalled road going to Hapur originates from the city. Modinagar railway station is in between Meerut and Ghaziabad stations. Most of the major express trains as well as all general passenger trains from Delhi to Meerut-Haridwar-Dehradun route stop at this railway station.

Economics 
Modinagar is known as the home of Modi Enterprises. The area has long been associated with sugar mills. The climate and good irrigation are ideal for growing fruit and vegetables. In recent years, Modinagar has grown as a bedroom community to Delhi and hosts a growing technology industry.

Education 
 Modern Academy
 Heritage Academy
 Green Land Academy
 Katar Singh Memorial Inter College
 Shiksha International School
 St Teresa's Academy
 Summerfield College of Higher Education
 Tulsi Ram Maheshwari Public School
 Chhaya Public School
 Dayawati Modi Public School
 Baal Bari Public School
 Adarsh Kanya Inter College
 Maharishi Inter College

University & Colleges
 SRM University
 Multanimal Modi P G College
 Ginni Devi Modi Girls P G College
 KN Modi Engineering college
 Janta degree college patla

Government and Politics
In 2022', Assembly elections Bhartiya Janta Party candidate Manju Shiwach won the election.

The city administration is based at Tehsil, Modinagar and both the top chairs of the city namely, Sub Divisional Magistrate and The Circle Officer of Police have office at Tehsil.

References

https://web.archive.org/web/20110528213837/http://www.acledu.co.in/

External links

 Modinagar City Nagar-Palika Website
 
 

 
Cities and towns in Ghaziabad district, India
Populated places established in 1933
Company towns in India
Cities in Uttar Pradesh
Industrial cities and towns in Uttar Pradesh
Modi Enterprises